The  (now known as Elijah's Ten Commandments Stone Country Korean Farmers) was a religious group founded in 1980 by a Chinese Korean man named Park Myung Hoo (朴鳴呼), with five levels of membership: God, Angel, General Secretary, Chief, and Director. It had a presence in Zhejiang, Anhui, Shandong, Henan, and 11 other Provinces, Autonomous regions, Direct-controlled municipality. It was centered in Northeast China and established its own state within a state commune network called the Stone Kingdom until its abolition in 1999.

It had more than a thousand members at its peak.

Development 
He called himself the last prophet "Elijah", asked his followers to worship him as a "Stone Immortal", called the World Elijah Mission a "Stone Kingdom", and created the constitution, national flag, and National anthem; declared that "the end of the world will come in the year 2000, and on September 30, 1997, Elijah will stand as God in the world", and proclaimed that he would "smash and destroy all nations".

The World Elijah Mission invested a large amount of money to carry out propaganda activities in China, and established more than 20 meeting points and contact points in various places, and rented land to build eight "Stone Kingdom" villages, where more than 600 believers sold their family property and moved their families to live together. Under the propaganda of the World Elijah Mission, more than a thousand Koreans and Han Chinese from the three northeastern provinces (Liaoning, Jilin, and Heilongjiang) joined the World Elijah Mission, and many of them sold all their family properties and moved to the "Stone Kingdom".

It registered as a church in Taiwan on February 15, 1983.

Qualitative 
On March 19, 1996, the Ministry of Public Security of the People's Republic of China clearly identified the "World Elijah Mission" as a cult in a special report to the Central leadership, "Jilin Province Public Security Authorities Investigate and Deal with the Infiltration Activities of the Korean Cult "World Elijah Mission".

Stone Kingdom

History 
The World Elijah Evangelical Mission was founded by Korean Park Myung Hoo in 1980 (later renamed as Elijah's Ten Commandments Stone Country Korean Farmers) has been operating in mainland China since 1993, covering Since its introduction into mainland China in 1993, the activities of the Elijah Ten Commandments Shikoku Hanon Restoration Society have involved 11 provinces, autonomous regions, and municipalities directly under the Central Government, including the Eastern provinces.

The organization also invested a large amount of money to infiltrate the Chinese mainland, establishing more than 20 meeting points and contact points in various places, and renting land to build eight "Stone Kingdom" villages, calling on a total of more than 600 believers to sell their family assets and move their families to the villages to live collectively, and using the villages as a base to build The "Stone Kingdom" (country within a country) was established on the basis of the village. They are forbidden to read newspaper, watch TV, listen to radio, cut off all contact with the outside world, and children are forbidden to go to school. The most important daily lesson is to study the doctrine, pray, repent, and reflect on whether they are loyal to the Lord.

It was busted by the Yilan County Public Security Bureau of Heilongjiang Province on May 30, 1999.

References 

Christian new religious movements
Chinese cults
Chinese salvationist religions
Pages with unreviewed translations
States and territories established in 1993
States and territories disestablished in 1999
Former monarchies of Asia
1980 establishments in China
1999 disestablishments in China
Religious organizations disestablished in 1999
Apocalyptic groups
Self-declared messiahs
Christian denominations founded in China
Elijah